is a Japanese writer from Osaka. She has won numerous Japanese literary awards, including the Akutagawa Prize, the Noma Literary New Face Prize, the Dazai Osamu Prize, the Kawabata Yasunari Prize, and the Oda Sakunosuke Prize.

Early life and education 

Tsumura was born in Osaka, Japan in 1978. While commuting to school she read science fiction novels, especially the work of William Gibson, Philip K. Dick, and Kurt Vonnegut, and began writing her own novel, Man'ītā (Maneater), while still a third-year university student. Man'ītā won the 21st Dazai Osamu Prize and was later published in book form under the title Kimi wa eien ni soitsura yori wakai.

Career 
In her first job out of college, Tsumura experienced workplace harassment and quit after ten months to retrain and find another position, an experience that inspired her to write stories about young workers. In 2008 Tsumura won the Noma Literary New Face Prize for her book Myūjikku buresu yū!! (Music Bless You!!), and in 2009 her novel Potosu raimu no fune (The Lime Pothos Boat), about a young woman experiencing precarious work, won the 140th Akutagawa Prize. Japanese literature scholar Kendall Heitzman described The Lime Pothos Boat as a "triumph" that "carefully depicts with great nuance a small cast of characters with competing interests and desires." Tsumura's book Wākāzu daijesuto (Workers' Digest), published in 2011, won the 28th Oda Sakunosuke Prize, and in 2013 her short story "Kyūsuitō to kame" ("The Water Tower and the Turtle") won the 39th Kawabata Yasunari Prize. The Japanese Ministry of Education, Culture, Sports, Science and Technology recognized Tsumura's work with a New Artist award in 2016.

Tsumura's writing often employs Kansai-ben, a distinctive Japanese dialect spoken in Osaka and surrounding cities.

Awards
 2005 21st Dazai Osamu Prize for Man'ītā (Maneater)
 2008 30th Noma Literary New Face Prize for Myūjikku buresu yū!! (Music Bless You!!)
2008 26th Sakuya Konohana Prize
 2009 140th Akutagawa Prize (2008下) for Potosu raimu no fune (The Lime Pothos Boat)
 2011 28th Oda Sakunosuke Prize for Wākāzu daijesuto (Workers' Digest)
 2013 39th Kawabata Yasunari Prize for Kyūsuitō to Kame (The Water Tower and The Turtle)
 2016 MEXT Award for New Artists for Kono yo ni tayasui shigoto wa nai (There's No Such Thing as an Easy Job)
2017 27th Murasaki Shikibu Literature Prize for Fuyūrei Burajiru (A Wandering Ghost in Brazil)

Works 
 Areguria to wa shigoto wa dekinai, Chikuma Shobo, 2008, 
 Myūjikku buresu yū!! (Music Bless You!!), Kadokawa Shoten, 2008, 
 Kasōsuki no yukue, Kodansha, 2008, 
 Potosu raimu no fune (The Lime Pothos Boat), Kodansha, 2009, 
 Kimi wa eien ni soitsura yori wakai, Chikuma Shobo, 2009, 
 Wākāzu daijesuto (Workers' Digest), Shueisha, 2011, 
 Matomo na ie no kodomo wa inai, Chikuma Shobo, 2011, 
 Yaritai koto wa nidone dake, Kodansha, 2012, 
 Tonikaku uchi ni kaerimasu, Shinchosha, 2012, 
 Kore kara oinori ni ikimasu, Kadokawa Shoten, 2013, 
 Pōsuke, Chūō Kōron Shinsha, 2013, 
 Evurishingu furouzu, Bungei Shunjū, 2014, 
 Nidone towa tōku ni arite omō mono, Kodansha, 2015, 
 Konoyoni tayasui shigoto wa nai [ : この世にたやすい仕事はない] (There's No Such Thing As An Easy Job), Nikkei Business Publications Inc., 2015, translated into English by Polly Barton, Bloomsbury Publishing, Inc. 2020-21. This is the first of Tsumura's books to be translated into English.
 Kuyokuyo manejimento, Seiryūshuppan, 2016, 
 Makuramoto no hondana, Jitsugyōnonihonsha, 2016, 
Fuyūrei Burajiru (A Wandering Ghost in Brazil), Bungei Shunjū, 2016, 
 Uesuto uingu (West Wing), Asahi Shimbun Shuppan, 2017, 
 Manuke na koyomi, Heibonsha, 2017, 
 Disu izu za dei (This is the Day), Asahi Shimbun Shuppan, 2018, 
———————
Notes

References

21st-century Japanese novelists
Living people
1978 births
Japanese women novelists
People from Osaka
Akutagawa Prize winners
21st-century Japanese women writers